Elachista passerini is a moth of the family Elachistidae. It is found in France, Spain and Italy.

References

passerini
Moths described in 1996
Moths of Europe